Sir Henry Murray Fox, GBE, FRICS (7 June 1912 – 9 November 1999) was a British chartered surveyor who was Lord Mayor of London from 1974 to 1975.

The son of Sir Sidney Fox, Sheriff of the City of London for 1952–53, and Molly Button, Murray Fox was educated at Malvern College and Emmanuel College, Cambridge. He joined Hallett, Fox & White, chartered surveyors, in 1935, subsequently becoming its senior partner; the firm later merged with Chesterton & Son.

A member of the Court of Common Council of the City of London between 1963 and 1982, he was Alderman for Bread Street Ward from 1966 to 1982. He was Sheriff of the City of London for 1971–72, Lord Mayor of London for 1974–75, and one of HM Lieutenants for the City of London from 1976 to 1983. He was also master of the Worshipful Company of Wheelwrights and of the Worshipful Company of Coopers. He was appointed a GBE in 1974.

Fox married Helen Isabella Margaret, daughter of J. B. Crichton; they had a son and two daughters. Lady Fox died in 1986.

References 

 Who Was Who
 "Sir Murray Fox", The Times, 11 November 1999, p. 31

External links 
 

1912 births
1999 deaths
Knights Grand Cross of the Order of the British Empire
20th-century lord mayors of London
Alumni of Emmanuel College, Cambridge
Chartered Surveyors
Sheriffs of the City of London
Councilmen of the City of London
Aldermen of the City of London